Danica was the first concentration and extermination camp established in the Independent State of Croatia during World War II. It was established in Koprivnica (modern-day Croatia) on 15 or 20 April 1941 in the deserted building of former fertilizer factory "Danica". Mijo Babić participated in preparations for the establishment of Danica concentration camp The first individual inmates were brought to Danica on 18 April 1941 while first groups arrived at the end of April 1941.

The Jews from Zagreb were transported to Danica and Jadovno early in May 1941. Those transported to Danica were all killed by July 1941, while those transported to Jadovno were all killed by August 1941. Already in June 1941 there were 2,000 inmates in Danica, most of them being Serbs followed by Croat communists, Jews and Romani people. The number of inmates reached 5,000 including 500 Jews.

Four hundred Romani were transported to Danica camp, some of them executed in the camp.

References

Sources

Further reading 
 Zdravko Dizdar, “Ljudski gubici logora 'Danica' kraj Koprivnice 1941–1942,” Cˇasopis za suvremenu povijest, vol. 34, no. 2 (2002)

Concentration camps of the Independent State of Croatia
Jewish Croatian history
The Holocaust in Yugoslavia
History of the Serbs of Croatia